Ken Xie is an American billionaire businessman who founded Systems Integration Solutions (SIS), NetScreen, and Fortinet. He is CEO of Fortinet, a cybersecurity firm based in Silicon Valley. Xie was previously the CEO of NetScreen, which was acquired by Juniper Networks for $4 billion in 2004. He built the first ASIC-based firewall/VPN appliance in 1996.

Early life 
Xie was born and raised in China. He graduated from Tsinghua University with a B.S. and M.S. in electrical engineering, and from Stanford University with an M.S. in electrical engineering.

Career 
In 1993, Xie founded a network security company, Systems Integration Solutions (SIS). Xie built the first ASIC-based firewall/VPN appliance in 1996, in his garage in Palo Alto, California. That same year he founded NetScreen Technologies, an online security firm, with Yan Ke and Feng Deng. NetScreen Technologies was later acquired by Juniper Networks Inc. for $4 billion.

Fortinet 
In 2000, Xie left NetScreen to create Fortinet with his brother Michael Xie, an electrical engineer. Since then, Ken Xie has served as Fortinet's CEO, while Michael Xie is president and chief technology officer.

Xie has stated that he founded Fortinet because he believed that security must be embedded in the end-to-end computing and networking infrastructure. The Xie brothers launched the initial FortiGate products in May 2002.

Xie has led Fortinet to acquire security monitoring firm AccelOps, endpoint security firm enSilo, and SOAR platform provider CyberSponse, among other companies.

Xie was made a member of the National Academy of Engineering in 2013.

In June 2018, Xie led Fortinet's acquisition of Bradford Networks, a lot-focused security firm.

In January 2019, Xie was a discussion leader for the Centre for Cybersecurity’s cyber workforce session at Davos’ World Economic Forum (WEF) summit. In February 2020, Ken Xie spoke at the RSA conference in San Francisco about the importance of SD-WAN, edge computing, and automation.

Xie is a founding member and a member of the board of board of directors of the Cyber Threat Alliance. In September 2020, Xie joined the Forbes 400 list.

Personal life 
Xie is married and lives in Los Altos Hills, California. He is the father of Jaime Xie, a fashion influencer and star on the Netflix reality TV series Bling Empire.

References 

1963 births
Living people
Chinese emigrants to the United States
American technology chief executives
American computer businesspeople
Businesspeople in software
Tsinghua University alumni
Members of Committee of 100
Stanford University alumni
Businesspeople from Beijing
American technology company founders
Chinese company founders
Members of the United States National Academy of Engineering
American billionaires
People from Los Altos Hills, California